Lowrider is a Swedish stoner rock band formed in Karlstad in the mid-1990s by bassist/singer Peder Bergstrand and lead guitarist/singer Ole Hellquist, along with guitarist Niclas Stalfors and drummer Andreas Eriksson.

History 
After releasing the Nebula/Lowrider Double EP in 1999 (split with psychedelic stoner rock band Nebula), the band embarked upon a European tour in 2000, when they played fourteen venues in eight countries, co-headlining with Dozer and once with Spiritual Beggars.

Their debut album Ode to Io was released in 2000. The release was hailed as "Sweden's answer to all that is rocky, funky, gritty and downright rock n' roll" by Critical Metal in 2001.

Discography

Albums 
 Ode to Io (2000) (re-release 2002)
 Refractions (2020)

EP 
 Nebula/Lowrider (1998) – split with Nebula

References

External links 
 Lowrider's record label

Swedish rock music groups
Swedish stoner rock musical groups